The R11 is a line of Rodalies de Catalunya's regional rail service, operated by Renfe Operadora. It runs northwards from the Barcelona area to the French border town of Cerbère, passing through the Vallès Oriental, Selva, Gironès and Alt Empordà regions.

The Maçanet-Massanes-Portbou section had not previously been considered part of the Barcelona commuter rail service; designated Ca2, the services running on it were part of Renfe Operadora's regional rail division in Catalonia. In 2010, after the administration of the Barcelona commuter rail service was transferred to the Catalan government, the line was passed from the Catalan regional rail division to Rodalies de Catalunya.

History
Earlier, all the regional rail services carrying out the line Barcelona-Girona-Figueres-Portbou were branded as Ca2 for the Catalan rail division, and 33 in the nationwide regional rail network. Before 2014, it was the only conventional line to serve the cities of Girona and Figueres (excluding the high-speed lines), until the creation of the Girona commuter rail service , running from Barcelona to Figueres initially, being later extended to Portbou.

Infrastructure

Like the rest of Rodalies de Catalunya lines, the R11 runs on the Iberian gauge mainline railway system, which is owned by Adif, an agency of the Spanish government. All of the railway lines carrying Rodalies de Catalunya services are electrified at 3,000 volts (V) direct current (DC) using overhead lines. The trains on the line call at up to 28 stations, using the following railway lines, in order from south to north:

All of the infrastructure used by the R11 is shared with other services. After Passeig de Gràcia, R11 trains R2 Sud trains, together with the R13, R14, R15 and R16, as well as long-distance services, branch off to Barcelona's Estació de França, terminating there. R11 services continue northwards through the Aragó Tunnel, calling at El Clot-Aragó railway station, and share tracks with the R2 and R2 Nord only. North of Mollet-Sant Fost railway station, Barcelona commuter rail service line  and several freight services join their route. The R8 terminates further north at  so that the R11 only shares tracks with the R2 and freight services from this point on up to Maçanet-Massanes. From Maçanet-Massanes, R11 trains share tracks with the Girona commuter rail service RG1 and freight trains for the remainder of their journey.

Operation

All services terminating at Cerbère call at all stations. Trains terminating at Girona, Figueres or Portbou, run either calling at all stations, or stopping at only some stations. The first trains run about 6:00 in the morning, with the latest arriving at about 11:00 at night. 

The designation of the services on the line depends on the route they operate. Services calling at all stations are branded as R (Regional), operated by RENFE Class 447 trains, while semi-fast services are branded as MD (Media Distancia/Mitjana Distancia), operated by RENFE Class 449 trains, Renfe Operadora's newest rolling stock for regional lines, and are more expensive than R trains..

List of stations
The following table lists the name of each station served by line R11 in order from south to north; the station's service pattern offered by R and/or MD trains; the transfers to other Rodalies de Catalunya lines, including both commuter and regional rail services; remarkable transfers to other transport systems; the municipality in which each station is located; and the fare zone each station belongs to according to the Autoritat del Transport Metropolità (ATM Àrea de Barcelona) fare-integrated public transport system and Rodalies de Catalunya's own fare zone system for Barcelona commuter rail service lines.

References

External links
 Rodalies de Catalunya official website
 Schedule for the R11 (PDF format)
 Official Twitter accounts by Rodalies de Catalunya for lines R11 with service status updates (tweets usually published only in Catalan)
 R11 (rodalia 11) on Twitter. Unofficial Twitter account by Rodalia.info monitoring real-time information about the R11 by its users.
 Information about the R11 at trenscat.cat 

11
Railway services introduced in 2010